007: Licence to Kill is a 1989 video game based on the James Bond film of the same name, developed by Quixel and published by Domark in 1989. It was released for Amiga, Amstrad CPC, Atari ST, BBC Micro, Commodore 64, DOS, MSX and ZX Spectrum. The game was later released in South Korea in 1996, for the Master System. 

The game's storyline closely follows that of the film, consisting of six scenes in which Bond chases drug czar Sanchez who has murdered his best friend Felix Leiter's bride. The scenes within the game vary in setting and include helicopter chases, underwater diving, water-skis and behind the wheel of an 18-wheel tanker truck.

Gameplay

007: Licence to Kill is a top down vertical scrolling action shoot-em-up where the objective is for the player to pursue the antagonist (drug lord Sanchez) through six premade levels in a variety of different methods. The right hand side of the screen contains a HUD which displays information about the current level, such as the height of the helicopter in the first level or the amount of ammunition remaining in the second level. Hostile enemies populate each level which can be killed or avoided and there are side objectives along the way such as picking up ammunition or drug caches. The player must dodge shots and environment dangers such as boats or falling rocks.

Platforms
007: Licence to Kill targeted multiple platforms initially and post-release with Mi6-HQ.com calling it "one of the widest released 007 titles ever."

Alongside the original versions was another version for BBC, coded by Lore Games who were subcontracted to Consul Technology who were in turn subcontracted to Domark. It was based largely on the graphics from the Spectrum version, but with a freshly written sprite engine, character 'AI', sound effects and status display.  It featured a double buffer screen refresh mechanism to eliminate flicker, and was available in cassette tape and floppy disc versions.

Another version was being written for NES by Simon Nicol from Tengen. Christ West from Quixel inspected this version after the others had been completed and considered it finished despite missing the final level, but it went unreleased as by that point the Domark publishers felt that too much time had passed since the film's release and so the NES version would not be worth releasing.

Reception
Computer Gaming World only recommended 007: Licence to Kill "strictly for the action-oriented player", with others likely finding it a "license to bore". ACE Magazine considered it "fun while it lasts, but once you've cracked it you won't bother to come back." The Games Machine was more positive, saying Licence to Kill was designed "on a grand scale" and that it "follow[s] the film quite well, albeit with scenes simplified to shoot-'em-up and dodge games." Both Games Machine and Amiga magazine The One agreed that it was an improvement on Domark's previous three games, with The One calling it "...probably the best Bond game ever. Not only did it successfully capture the spirit of the film, it was also an enjoyable game to boot."

See also
List of video games based on films

References

External links

1989 video games
DOS games
Amiga games
BBC Micro and Acorn Electron games
Commodore 64 games
ZX Spectrum games
Amstrad CPC games
Atari ST games
James Bond video games
Cancelled Nintendo Entertainment System games
Licence to Kill
Domark games
Video games based on films
Video games scored by David Whittaker
Master System games
Video games developed in the United Kingdom